Zarza can be:

 Zarza la Mayor, municipality located in the province of Cáceres, Extremadura, Spain
 Zarza de Tajo, municipality in Cuenca, Castile-La Mancha, Spain
 Zarza de Montánchez, municipality located in the province of Cáceres, Extremadura, Spain
 Zarza de Granadilla, municipality located in the province of Cáceres, Extremadura
 Zarza-Capilla, Spanish municipality in the province of Badajoz, Extremadura
 Anselmo Zarza Bernal, Roman Catholic Bishop in Mexico
 Rafael Zarza Gonzalez, Cuban artist specializing in painting, engraving and graphic design
 Samuel ibn Seneh Zarza, Spanish philosopher who lived at Valencia in the second half of the 14th century

See also 
 La Zarza (disambiguation)
 Zarzuela, a Spanish opera genre whose name is derived from the word Zarza.